Mayeda Peak is a peak,  high, standing in the Marshall Mountains of the Queen Alexandra Range, Antarctica,  north of Mount Marshall. It was named by the Advisory Committee on Antarctic Names for Fred H. Mayeda, a United States Antarctic Research Program meteorologist at South Pole Station, 1959.

References

External links

Mountains of the Ross Dependency
Shackleton Coast